is a former Japanese football player.

Playing career
Tsubouchi was born in Takasaki on May 5, 1983. After graduating from high school, he joined J1 League club Vissel Kobe in 2002. He played many matches as left side back from 2003. However he could not play many matches in 2005 and Vissel was relegated to J2 League end of 2005 season. He became a regular player in 2006 and Vissel was returned to J1 in a year. However his opportunity to play decreased in 2007. In 2008, he moved to newly was promoted to J1 League club, Consadole Sapporo. Although he played as regular left side back, Consadole finished at the bottom place and was relegated to J2. In 2009, he moved to Oita Trinita. Although he played many matches as substitute defender, Trinita was relegated to J2. In 2010, he moved to Omiya Ardija. He played many matches as side back and center back. However his opportunity to play decreased in 2012. In August 2012, he moved to Albirex Niigata. However he could not play many matches. In August 2014, he moved to J2 club Júbilo Iwata. However he could not play many matches. In 2016, he moved to his local club Thespakusatsu Gunma in J2. Although he played many matches in 2016, he could not play many matches in 2017 and Thespakusatsu was relegated to J3 League end of 2017 season. He retired end of 2018 season.

Club statistics
Updated to 15 December 2018.

References

External links

1983 births
Living people
Association football people from Gunma Prefecture
Japanese footballers
J1 League players
J2 League players
J3 League players
Vissel Kobe players
Hokkaido Consadole Sapporo players
Oita Trinita players
Omiya Ardija players
Albirex Niigata players
Júbilo Iwata players
Thespakusatsu Gunma players
Association football defenders